Beaudreau is a surname. Notable people with the surname include:

Joseph Beaudreau (1826–1869), Canadian politician
Robert H. Beaudreau (1912–1980), American intelligence agent and judge
Tommy Beaudreau, American attorney

See also
Boudreau

Surnames of French origin